The Arnhem Plateau, an interim Australian bioregion, is located in the Northern Territory of Australia, comprising an area of  of the raised and heavily dissected sandstone plateau that characterises central Arnhem Land in the Top End of the Northern Territory.

Description
The boundary of the  Important Bird Area (IBA) is largely defined by the extent of vegetation suitable for white-throated grasswrens.  The most important habitat for grasswrens is bare rock and spinifex grassland.  Other vegetation includes open monsoonal savanna woodland and patches of rainforest, especially that dominated by the endemic tree Allosyncarpia ternata.  About a quarter of the IBA is within Kakadu National Park; a southern outlier is in Nitmiluk National Park, with much of the remainder due to be incorporated in the Wardekken Indigenous Protected Area.

Birds
Identified as an important bird area by BirdLife International, the plateau supports the entire population of white-throated grasswrens, and most of the populations of white-lined honeyeaters, chestnut-quilled rock-pigeons and the local subspecies of black-banded fruit doves and helmeted friarbirds. It also supports populations of bush stone-curlews, varied lorikeets, northern rosellas, rainbow pittas, white-gaped, yellow-tinted, bar-breasted and banded honeyeaters, silver-crowned friarbirds, masked and long-tailed finches, and sandstone shrike-thrushes.

See also

 Birds of Australia
 Geography of Australia

References

Arnhem Land
Arnhem Land tropical savanna
IBRA regions
Important Bird Areas of the Northern Territory
Plateaus of Australia